Bringing Assad to Justice is a 2021 Irish documentary film about bringing the Syrian President Bashar al-Assad to justice for  war crimes and crimes against humanity during the Syrian Civil War.It is produced by Anne Daly and Ronan Tynan.

References

External Links

Irish documentary films